Boxberg is a small town in the western Thuringian Basin about 5 kilometers southwest of Gotha, Germany.

The name means "mountain where sheep/bucks graze", as the older German spelling "Bocksberg" suggests.

The town is built on a hilly range which covers an area of five square kilometers. The federal highway (Autobahn A4) cuts through the middle of the town.

The Thuringian Forest (Halle–Bebra) railway and the Leina Canal also run through the Boxberg area.

Boxberg is famous for its horse racing track, (a 19th-century English-style horse racing course) which is still in use today.

References

Mountains of Thuringia
Mountains under 1000 metres
Thuringia
Gotha